The 2021–22 NBL season was the 39th season for Melbourne United in the NBL, and their 8th under the banner of Melbourne United.

Roster

Standings

Ladder 

The NBL tie-breaker system as outlined in the NBL Rules and Regulations states that in the case of an identical win–loss record, the overall points percentage will determine order of seeding.

Game log

Pre-season

Ladder 

|-style="background:#cfc;"
| 1
| 13 November
| New Zealand
| W 90–84
| Jo Lual-Acuil (37)
| Jo Lual-Acuil (11)
| Matthew Dellavedova (6)
| Melbourne Sports and Aquatic Centreclosed event
| 1–0
|-style="background:#fcc;"
| 2
| 15 November
| @ Sydney
| L 80–75
| Jo Lual-Acuil (13)
| Mason Peatling (8)
| Caleb Agada (4)
| Melbourne Sports and Aquatic Centreclosed event
| 1–1
|-style="background:#fcc;"
| 3
| 20 November
| Illawarra
| L 90–97
| Jo Lual-Acuil (20)
| Jo Lual-Acuil (9)
| Matthew Dellavedova (6)
| Melbourne Sports and Aquatic Centreclosed event
| 1–2
|-style="background:#fcc;"
| 4
| 28 November
| @ S.E. Melbourne
| L 89–87
| Chris Goulding (26)
| Jo Lual-Acuil (10)
| Matthew Dellavedova (9)
| Melbourne Sports Centreclosed event
| 1–3

Regular season 

|-style="background:#fcc;"
| 1
| 5 December
| @ Sydney
| L 79–74
| Jo Lual-Acuil (12)
| Mason Peatling (9)
| Matthew Dellavedova (6)
| Qudos Bank Arena8,632
| 0–1
|-style="background:#fcc;"
| 2
| 12 December
| S.E. Melbourne
| L 86–94
| Matthew Dellavedova (19)
| Dellavedova, Newley (9)
| Matthew Dellavedova (5)
| John Cain Arena6,361
| 0–2
|-style="background:#cfc;"
| 3
| 16 December
| Sydney
| W 89–47
| Caleb Agada (21)
| Jo Lual-Acuil (8)
| Matthew Dellavedova (5)
| John Cain Arena4,786
| 1–2
|-style="background:#cfc;"
| 4
| 19 December
| New Zealand
| W 83–60
| Chris Goulding (21)
| Jo Lual-Acuil (9)
| Matthew Dellavedova (7)
| John Cain Arena5,479
| 2–2
|-style="background:#cfc;"
| 5
| 26 December
| @ Sydney
| W 68–82
| Caleb Agada (24)
| Caleb Agada (14)
| Matthew Dellavedova (4)
| Qudos Bank Arena4,725
| 3–2

|-style="background:#cfc;"
| 6
| 1 January
| @ Tasmania
| W 72–76
| Jo Lual-Acuil (19)
| Jo Lual-Acuil (8)
| Matthew Dellavedova (5)
| MyState Bank Arena4,685
| 4–2
|-style="background:#cfc;"
| 7
| 14 January
| @ New Zealand
| W 78–89
| Chris Goulding (23)
| Jo Lual-Acuil (13)
| Matthew Dellavedova (5)
| MyState Bank Arenaclosed event
| 5–2
|-style="background:#cfc;"
| 8
| 16 January
| @ Illawarra
| W 84–88
| Matthew Dellavedova (33)
| Caleb Agada (15)
| Matthew Dellavedova (8)
| WIN Entertainment Centre1,753
| 6–2
|-style="background:#cfc;"
| 9
| 22 January
| @ Adelaide
| W 78–97
| Goulding, Lual-Acuil (18)
| Jo Lual-Acuil (8)
| Shea Ili (7)
| Adelaide Entertainment Centre4,819
| 7–2
|-style="background:#cfc;"
| 10
| 26 January
| @ Brisbane
| W 82–84
| Matthew Dellavedova (16)
| Jo Lual-Acuil (10)
| Agada, Ili (4)
| Nissan Arena2,479
| 8–2
|-style="background:#fcc;"
| 11
| 30 January
| @ Adelaide
| L 88–83 (OT)
| Jo Lual-Acuil (23)
| Jo Lual-Acuil (12)
| Matthew Dellavedova (9)
| Adelaide Entertainment Centre4,906
| 8–3

|-style="background:#fcc;"
| 12
| 6 February
| Tasmania
| L 85–94
| Chris Goulding (29)
| Jo Lual-Acuil (21)
| Shea Ili (5)
| John Cain Arena8,499
| 8–4
|-style="background:#cfc;"
| 13
| 12 February
| Perth
| W 93–87
| Jo Lual-Acuil (22)
| Agada, Lual-Acuil (13)
| Matthew Dellavedova (5)
| John Cain Arena6,401
| 9–4
|-style="background:#cfc;"
| 14
| 17 February
| S.E. Melbourne
| W 94–87
| Jo Lual-Acuil (30)
| Jack White (14)
| Shea Ili (8)
| John Cain Arena5,012
| 10–4
|-style="background:#cfc;"
| 15
| 20 February
| New Zealand
| W 108–73
| Caleb Agada (17)
| Caleb Agada (9)
| Matthew Dellavedova (9)
| John Cain Arena6,033
| 11–4
|-style="background:#cfc;"
| 16
| 27 February
| @ Cairns
| W 73–89
| Chris Goulding (21)
| Hukporti, Peatling, White (8)
| Matthew Dellavedova (5)
| Cairns Convention Centre3,272
| 12–4

|-style="background:#cfc;"
| 17
| 5 March
| Brisbane
| W 95–83
| Jo Lual-Acuil (20)
| Lual-Acuil, White (8)
| Shea Ili (6)
| John Cain Arena6,086
| 13–4
|-style="background:#fcc;"
| 18
| 10 March
| Perth
| L 87–97
| Jo Lual-Acuil (16)
| Jack White (9)
| Matthew Dellavedova (5)
| John Cain Arena4,169
| 13–5
|-style="background:#cfc;"
| 19
| 13 March
| @ S.E. Melbourne
| W 90–98
| Matthew Dellavedova (22)
| Jo Lual-Acuil (15)
| Shea Ili (5)
| John Cain Arena8,319
| 14–5
|-style="background:#cfc;"
| 20
| 20 March
| Adelaide
| W 101–74
| Lual-Acuil, Newley (15)
| Jo Lual-Acuil (9)
| Chris Goulding (6)
| John Cain Arena5,814
| 15–5
|-style="background:#fcc;"
| 21
| 27 March
| Illawarra
| L 77–92
| Jo Lual-Acuil (18)
| Caleb Agada (13)
| Caleb Agada (5)
| John Cain Arena5,017
| 15–6

|-style="background:#fcc;"
| 22
| 2 April
| Illawarra
| L 90–96
| Jack White (17)
| Hukporti, Lual-Acuil, Newley (5)
| Shea Ili (5)
| John Cain Arena4,517
| 15–7
|-style="background:#cfc;"
| 23
| 4 April
| @ Perth
| W 75–84
| Chris Goulding (18)
| Jack White (10)
| Matthew Dellavedova (6)
| RAC Arena10,192
| 16–7
|-style="background:#cfc;"
| 24
| 7 April
| @ S.E. Melbourne
| W 88–90
| Chris Goulding (20)
| Jo Lual-Acuil (11)
| Dellavedova, Ili, Lual-Acuil (4)
| John Cain Arena4,167
| 17–7
|-style="background:#cfc;"
| 25
| 10 April
| @ Cairns
| W 63–92
| Jo Lual-Acuil (23)
| Jo Lual-Acuil (11)
| Matthew Dellavedova (7)
| Cairns Convention Centre3,418
| 18–7
|-style="background:#cfc;"
| 26
| 16 April
| Brisbane
| W 88–79
| Jo Lual-Acuil (25)
| Jo Lual-Acuil (13)
| Shea Ili (8)
| John Cain Arena5,721
| 19–7
|-style="background:#cfc;"
| 27
| 18 April
| Cairns
| W 92–80
| Chris Goulding (27)
| Ariel Hukporti (9)
| Shea Ili (8)
| John Cain Arena6,042
| 20–7
|-style="background:#fcc;"
| 28
| 23 April
| @ Tasmania
| L 83–61
| Caleb Agada (22)
| Agada, Lual-Acuil (8)
| Chris Goulding (3)
| MyState Bank Arena4,865
| 20–8

Postseason 

|-style="background:#cfc;"
| 1
| 28 April
| Tasmania
| W 74–63
| Caleb Agada (16)
| Jack White (10)
| Matthew Dellavedova (5)
| John Cain Arena5,268
| 1–0
|-style="background:#fcc;"
| 2
| 30 April
| @ Tasmania
| L 79–72
| Chris Goulding (18)
| Jack White (8)
| Agada, Dellavedova, Ili, Lual-Acuil (3)
| MyStateBank Arena4,865
| 1–1
|-style="background:#fcc;"
| 3
| 2 May
| Tasmania
| L 73–76
| Shea Ili (18)
| Jack White (15)
| Matthew Dellavedova (7)
| John Cain Arena4,816
| 1–2

Transactions

Re-signed

Additions

Subtractions

Awards

Club awards 
 SHARE Award: Shea Ili
 Defensive Player: Shea Ili
 Club MVP: Jo Lual-Acuil
 Vince Crivelli Club Person of the Year: Tom Lewis (Commercial Operations Assistant)

See also 
 2021–22 NBL season
 Melbourne United

References

External links 

 Official Website

Melbourne United
Melbourne United seasons
Melbourne United season